{{Speciesbox
|image = Lethrinus_obsoletus.jpg
|image_caption =
|status = LC 
|status_system = IUCN3.1
|status_ref = 
|genus = Lethrinus
|species = obsoletus
|authority = (Forsskål, 1775)
|synonyms =
Lethrinus cutambi Seale, 1910Lethrinus ramak (Forsskål, 1775)Sciaena obsoleta Forsskål, 1775Sciaena ramak Forsskål, 1775
}}Lethrinus obsoletus'', the orange-striped emperor, is a species of bony fish in the family Lethrinidae.

References

External links
 
 

Lethrinidae
Fish described in 1775
Taxa named by Peter Forsskål